Kastellholmen is an islet in the centre of Stockholm, Sweden. It belongs to the district of Skeppsholmen. It is connected to  adjacent  Skeppsholmen  through the  Kastellholmsbron bridge. 
 
Kastellholmen has an area of 31,000 m².  Kastellholmen has previously been known as Notholmen, Lilla Beckholmen and Skansholmen.  On the island there is a small castle, Kastellet, which was built between 1846-1848  under design  by Swedish officer and architect  Fredrik Blom (1781–1853). Kastellholmen, like Skeppsholmen, has been managed by the Swedish National Property Agency since 1993 and is part of the Royal National City Park.

See also
 Geography of Stockholm
 Beckholmen

References

Other Sources
Statens Fastighetsverk, nulägesbeskrivning Skeppsholmen-Kastellholmen, 2007. PDF 6,4 Mbyte.
Statens fastighetsverk, Skeppsholmen-Kastellholmen, historik, 2007 PDF 4,7 Mbyte.

Islands of Stockholm